Linda Redlick Hirshman (born April 26, 1944) is an American lawyer, pundit, and the author of multiple books on the law, women's studies, and philosophy.

Life and career 
Hirshman was born in Cleveland, Ohio. She holds a J.D. degree from the University of Chicago Law School and a Ph.D. in philosophy. She wrote her dissertation on the problem of social organizing in the work of Thomas Hobbes.

For fifteen years, she practiced law, representing mostly organized labor. She participated in three cases in the Supreme Court of the United States, including, in 1985, the landmark case of Garcia v. San Antonio Metropolitan Transit Authority, which established the line between the federal government and the states. She then went into academia, teaching law, philosophy, and women's studies, before she retired from Brandeis University as a distinguished professor of philosophy and women's studies in 2002.

She has written for a variety of periodicals, including The New York Times,  The Washington Post, Slate, Salon, and The Daily Beast.

In 2006, Hirshman released Get to Work: A Manifesto for Women of the World in which she developed the arguments in her 2005 article “Homeward Bound" in favor of women working, to use their capacities, be independent and be of benefit to the larger society, and addressed some of the criticism of her earlier work.

In June 2012, Hirshman released her new book, a social movement study, Victory: The Triumphant Gay Revolution. Starting in the late nineteenth century and ending when New York State legalized same-sex marriage, Victory tells the story of this political success. In 2015, she published Sisters in Law, an account of the careers of the first two women to serve as justices of the Supreme Court, Sandra Day O'Connor and Ruth Bader Ginsburg, and how they have advanced the cause of women's rights. In 2019 a play premiered based on that book, also called Sisters in Law. Also in 2019 her book Reckoning: The Epic Battle Against Sexual Abuse and Harassment was published. 

Her most recent book, The Color of Abolition, is about the contentious relationship between Frederick Douglass and white abolitionists.

Criticism 
According to Hirshman's own biographical byline for periodicals, she "landed spot No. 77" on author Bernard Goldberg's list of 100 People Who Are Screwing Up America "with almost no effort." Goldberg criticized Hirshman for comments she made in a segment produced by Lesley Stahl on 60 Minutes in October 2004. Hirshman's comments involved young, well-educated women who chose to give up high-paying, high-powered, and prestigious jobs in order to stay home and take care of their children. In the segment, Hirshman argued that this kind of decision would only lead to a lesser life for these women: "These women are choosing lives in which they do not use their capacity for very complicated work, they're choosing lives in which they do not use their capacity to deal with very powerful other adults in the world, which takes a lot of skill. I think there are better lives and worse lives."

Hirshman was also criticized by feminist bloggers such as Leslie Morgan Steiner and economists such as Heather Boushey for having insufficient empirical evidence for her contention that women were dropping out of the U.S. labor market, a charge which Hirshman says does not change her conclusions. Women, she says, who opt to stay at home are disproportionately among the educated elite and however many there are, their decision affects the gender composition of the people who run the society and the way that other women, in the workplace or not, think about their lives.

Personal life
Hirshman is widowed, has three daughters and several grandchildren.

References

External links 
 Video interview/discussion with Hirshman and Michelle Goldberg on Bloggingheads.tv
 GetToWorkManifesto.com, Hirschman's official website
 

1944 births
American women lawyers
American women's rights activists
Living people
Lawyers from Cleveland
Brandeis University alumni
University of Chicago alumni